Damon Moore (born September 15, 1976) is a former American football safety in the National Football League (NFL). He was drafted by the Philadelphia Eagles in the fourth round of the 1999 NFL Draft. He played college football at Ohio State.

Moore also played for the Chicago Bears.

References

1976 births
Living people
American football safeties
Ohio State Buckeyes football players
Philadelphia Eagles players
Chicago Bears players